Staryi Uhryniv is a village in Kalush Raion, of Ivano-Frankivsk Oblast in western Ukraine. The local government is administered by Serednouhrynivska village council. It belongs to Novytsia rural hromada, one of the hromadas of Ukraine.

History

The first mention of Staryi Uhryniv is in 1447.  Villagers are known to have taken part in the Khmelnytsky Uprising of 1648.

Notable residents
Today, Staryi Uhryniv is the best known as the birthplace of Stepan Bandera, who was born on January 1, 1909.

Hryhorii Perehiniak ("Korobka" or "Dovbeshka") (1912–22 February 1943), organiser of UPA.

References

Further reading
 Грабовецький В. Г — 75 Ілюстрована історія Прикарпаття. Друге доповнене видання. — Івано-Франківськ: «Нова Зоря», 2002.

External links
 weather.in.ua, Staryi Uhryniv (Ivano-Frankivsk region)

Villages in Kalush Raion